The 2022 Syracuse Orange football team represented Syracuse University during the 2022 NCAA Division I FBS football season. The Orange were led by seventh-year head coach Dino Babers and played their home games at the JMA Wireless Dome, competing as members of the Atlantic Coast Conference.

After being picked to finish last in the preseason media poll, Syracuse went 7–6, 4–4 in ACC play to finish in 5th place in the Atlantic Division. The Orange started the season 6–0 for the first time since their undefeated 1987 season, and were ranked as high as No. 14 before losing five games in a row. The Orange faced three ranked teams, defeating NC State while losing to Clemson and Florida State. They were invited to the Pinstripe Bowl, where they lost to Minnesota.

Previous season

The Orange finished the season 5–7, 2–6 in ACC play to finish in sixth place in the Atlantic Division, and tenth overall in the conference.

Schedule

The ACC released their schedule on January 31, 2022.

Game summaries

vs. Louisville

at UConn

vs. Purdue

vs. Virginia

vs. Wagner

vs. No. 15 NC State

at No. 5 Clemson

vs. Notre Dame

at Pittsburgh

vs. No. 23 Florida State

at Wake Forest

at Boston College

vs. Minnesota (Pinstripe Bowl)

Rankings

Personnel

Coaching staff

References

Syracuse
Syracuse Orange football seasons
Syracuse Orange football